Alexander Low (born 1908; date of death unknown) was a Scottish footballer who played as a centre half.

Career
Raised in Greenhill, Low played club football for Falkirk, Workington (loan), Tunbridge Wells Rangers (loan) and Raith Rovers, with the later part of his career interrupted by World War II. 

Low made one appearance for Scotland in 1933, a defeat to Ireland in Glasgow – he was one of five in the home team who were not selected for international duty again.

References

1908 births
Year of death missing
Scottish footballers
Scotland international footballers
Falkirk F.C. players
Workington A.F.C. players
Tunbridge Wells F.C. players
Raith Rovers F.C. players
Dundee United F.C. wartime guest players
Scottish Junior Football Association players
Scottish Football League players
Association football defenders
Date of birth missing
Place of death missing
Footballers from Falkirk (council area)